Doris Seale (born Doris Marion Seale; July 10, 1936 – February 17, 2017) was a Santee Dakota, Abenaki and Cree librarian, poet, writer, and educator. She worked as a librarian for 45 years.  She has written about Native Americans sending positive messages to children. Her work has helped to educate teachers about the truth about Native American people and cultures. She was a co-founder of Oyate, an advocacy and education organization which reviews children's literature to ensure it treats Native Americans with "historical accuracy, cultural appropriateness and without anti-Indian bias and stereotypes".

She wrote poetry and non-fiction that focused on these themes. Her last published work, A Broken Flute: The Native Experience in Books for Children, dealt with issues of cultural appropriation. It included a chapter on deconstructing the myths perpetuated about the first Thanksgiving, helping educators create more culturally appropriate activities for the holiday. Her activism extended into other areas of her work. When she received the ALA Equity Award in 2001, the ceremony was being held at the Marriott Hotel in San Francisco, a hotel that was in a labor dispute with its workers. Seale joined that picket line rather than go inside to accept her award.

Awards
 2001 American Library Association Equality Award 
 2006 American Book Award

Works

Poetry

Non-fiction

Editor

References

External links
"Doris Seale", Native American Authors Project
"Resources for Teaching About Native Americans", Encyclopedia Smithsonian

Santee Dakota people
Abenaki people
American educators
Cree people
Native American writers
American women poets
American Book Award winners
American librarians
American women librarians
Native American women writers
1936 births
2017 deaths
20th-century Native American women
20th-century Native Americans
21st-century Native American women
21st-century Native Americans
20th-century American women writers
21st-century American women writers